is a private junior college in Tsuruga, Fukui, Japan, established in 1986.

External links
 Official website 

Educational institutions established in 1986
Private universities and colleges in Japan
Universities and colleges in Fukui Prefecture
1986 establishments in Japan
Japanese junior colleges